Workers' Fight has been the name of several Trotskyist groups and publications in Britain.

Organisations

Workers' Fight is also the name of a group in England linked to the French Lutte Ouvrière that focuses on activity in large factory workplaces, rather than trade union or community-based work. They publish the journal Class Struggle on a bi-monthly basis.
Another group named Workers' Fight split from the Workers International League in 1998, publishing two editions of a newspaper of the same name before disintegrating.

Publications

Workers' Fight was the publication of the Revolutionary Socialist League, in the period when it was led by C. L. R. James in the late 1930s.  A new collected edition of this paper was recently issued in Sweden.
Workers' Fight was also the original publication of the group now known as the Alliance for Workers' Liberty. It appeared for a short period in 1967-1968 before the group joined the International Socialists as a faction.  The group was expelled from IS in 1971 and was known by the same name as its publication again until it merged with Workers Power to form the International-Communist League in 1975.

References

Internationalist Communist Union
Trotskyist organisations in the United Kingdom